Renato Brunetta (born 15 May 1950) is an Italian economist and politician.  He was the Minister of Public Administration and Innovation from 8 May 2008 to 16 November 2011 in the Berlusconi government. He was also the minister for Public Administration in the Draghi government, from 13 February 2021 until 22 october 2022. He was the head of Forza Italia's deputies group at the Chamber of Deputies from 2013 to 2018.

Early life and career
Renato Brunetta was born on 15 May 1950, in Venice, Italy, the youngest of three brothers. He grew up in a poor family and his father was a peddler. He attended the classical lyceum Foscarini. Brunetta once said that as a boy, he often studied classics on his own, to "reduce the social gap between him and his fellow students".

On 2 July 1973, he graduated in political and economic sciences at the University of Padua. He began his academic career at the same university holding various positions: from 1973 to 1974 he was an assistant professor of theory and development policy and applied economics. In the academic year 1977–78, he became professor of economics and labor policy. From 1982 to 1990, he was an associate professor of fundamentals of economics at the Department of Economic and Social Analysis of the Territory at the Iuav University of Venice. From 1991 to 1999, he was associate professor of labor economics at University of Rome Tor Vergata, where he also held the position of professor of the political economy until 2009.

Since 1976, Brunetta has been enrolled as a freelance journalist in the Order of Journalists of Veneto. He is a columnist of Il Sole 24 Ore and Il Giornale. Moreover, he is founder and editor of the magazine Labor – Reviews of labor economics and industrial relations, published by Wiley-Blackwell for the Center for Economic and International Studies (CEIS) of the Tor Vergata University. Together with Vittorio Feltri, he wrote a series of Manuals of Political Conversation published by Libero. In June 2020, he briefly became a columnist of Il Riformista, a centrist and liberal newspaper directed by Piero Sansonetti, which he left in October 2020.

Political activity
He is a former member of the Italian Socialist Party, Member of the European Parliament for the North-East from 2004 to 2009 with the Forza Italia, part of the European People's Party, and vice-chair of the European Parliament's Committee on Industry, Research and Energy.

Career
 He a former professor of Labour Economics at the University of Rome Tor Vergata.
 In the 1980s and 1990s he was an economics adviser to the governments of Bettino Craxi, Giuliano Amato, and Carlo Azeglio Ciampi.
 From 1985 to 1989, he was the vice-chairman of the Labour and Social Affairs Committee of the Organisation for Economic Co-operation and Development (in Paris).
 From 1983 to 1987 he was an official of the Ministry of Labour with overall responsibility for employment strategy and incomes policy.
 In 1989 he founded the European Association of Labour Economists, of which he is the first chairman.
 From 1999 to 2008 he was a member of the European Parliament.
 He is the founder and editor of the journal Labour - Review of labour economics and industrial relations. He has also written for the newspapers Il Sole 24 Ore, Il Giornale, and Avanti!.

See also
1999 European Parliament election in Italy
2004 European Parliament election in Italy

External links

Notes

1950 births
Draghi Cabinet
Living people
Politicians of Veneto
Politicians from Venice
The People of Freedom politicians
Forza Italia (2013) politicians
Italian Socialist Party politicians
Italian economists
Italian journalists
Italian male journalists
Labor economists
Forza Italia MEPs
MEPs for Italy 2004–2009
MEPs for Italy 1999–2004
Academic staff of the University of Rome Tor Vergata